Borore is a comune (municipality) in the Province of Nuoro in the Italian region Sardinia, located about  north of Cagliari and about  west of Nuoro.

Borore borders the following municipalities: Aidomaggiore, Birori, Dualchi, Macomer, Norbello, Santu Lussurgiu, Scano di Montiferro.

References

External links

 Official website

Cities and towns in Sardinia